Arges-e Sofla (also Romanized as Arges-e Soflá and Argas Sofla; also known as Areks, Areks-e Soflá, Erkes-e Pā’īn, and Erkes-e Soflá) is a village in Kamazan-e Sofla Rural District, Zand District, Malayer County, Hamadan Province, Iran. At the 2006 census, its population was 154, in 31 families.

References 

Populated places in Malayer County